The Mortgage Works (UK) plc is a specialist Buy to Let mortgage lender of Nationwide Building Society, working primarily through regulated intermediaries and based in Bournemouth, Dorset, England. They specialise in buy to let mortgage finance.

Originally Sun Bank, it was purchased by the Portman Building Society in 2001 and renamed to The Mortgage Works in 2004. When Portman was merged with the Nationwide in 2007 they continued to trade under a separate name as a subsidiary.

External links
The Mortgage Works official website for mortgage brokers
TMWOnline - official website for online applications by mortgage brokers
The Mortgage Works official website for direct customers

References

Mortgage lenders
Financial services companies of England
Companies based in Bournemouth